The Brucellaceae are a family of the Gram-negative Hyphomicrobiales. They are named after Sir David Bruce, a Scottish microbiologist. They are aerobic chemoorganotrophes. The family comprises pathogen and soil bacteria

Phylogeny
The currently accepted taxonomy is based on the List of Prokaryotic names with Standing in Nomenclature (LPSN). The phylogeny is based on whole-genome analysis.

References

Hyphomicrobiales